A cercaria (plural cercariae) is the larval form of the trematode class of parasites. It develops within the germinal cells of the sporocyst or redia. A cercaria has a tapering head with large penetration glands. It may or may not have a long swimming "tail", depending on the species. The motile cercaria finds and settles in a host where it will become either an adult, or a mesocercaria, or a metacercaria, according to species.

The term Cercaria is also used as a genus name in descriptions of species when only the larval form is known.

Rotifers (Rotaria rotatoria) produce a chemical, Schistosome Paralysis Factor, suppressing cercaria swimming and reducing infections.

References 

Larvae
Reproduction in animals
Digenea